Post-truth politics (also called post-factual politics and post-reality politics) is a political culture where truth and falsity, and honesty and lies, have become a focal concern of public life and are viewed by popular commentators and academic researchers alike as having an important causal role in how politics operates at a particular point in history (especially influenced by new communication and media technologies). Oxford Dictionaries declared that its international word of the year in 2016 was "post-truth", citing a 20-fold increase in usage compared to 2015 and noted that it was commonly associated with the noun "post-truth politics". Popularized as a term in news media and a dictionary definition, post-truth has developed from a short-hand label for the abundance and influence of misleading or false political claims into a concept empirically studied and theorized by academic research.

Since post-truth politics are primarily known through public truth statements in specific media contexts (commentary on major broadcasting networks, podcasts, YouTube videos, and social media), it is especially studied as a media and communication studies phenomenon with particular forms of truth-telling: intentional rumors, lies, conspiracy theories, and fake news (subsequently gaining philosophers' attention). Post-truth politics' historical nature has also been discussed with regard to more traditional areas of communication and journalism studies such as propaganda.

, political commentators and academic researchers have identified post-truth politics as ascendant in many nations, notably Australia, Brazil, China, India, Russia, the United Kingdom, and the United States, among others.

History of terminology
The term post-truth politics appears to have developed from other adjectival uses of "post-truth", such as "post-truth political environment", "post-truth world", "post-truth era", "post-truth society", and very close cousins, such as "post-fact society" and "post-truth presidency". According to Oxford Dictionaries, the Serbian-American playwright Steve Tesich may have been the first to use the term post-truth in a 1992 essay in The Nation. Tesich writes that following the shameful truth of Watergate (1972–1974), more assuaging coverage of the Iran–Contra scandal (1985–1987) and Persian Gulf War (1990–1991) demonstrates that "we, as a free people, have freely decided that we want to live in some post-truth world." However, as Harsin (2018) notes, the term was in academic circulation in the 1990s. The media studies scholar John Hartley used the term "post-truth as the title of a chapter, "Journalism in a Post-truth Society", in his 1992 book The Politics of Pictures.

In 2004 Ralph Keyes used the term "post-truth era" in his book by that title. In it he argued that deception is becoming more prevalent in the current media-driven world. According to Keyes, lies stopped being treated as something inexcusable and started being viewed as something acceptable in certain situations, which supposedly led to the beginning of the post-truth era. The same year American journalist Eric Alterman spoke of a "post-truth political environment" and coined the term "the post-truth presidency" in his analysis of the misleading statements made by the Bush administration after 9/11 in 2001. More specifically, the American academic Moustafa Bayoumi argued that it was the 2003 "Iraq War that ushered in the post-truth era and that the United States is to blame". Although lies have always been the daily bread of politics, nevertheless Bayoumi believes that there is a difference compared to the times, for example, of the Spanish-American war or of the Gulf of Tonkin incident. Starting from 2002-2003, through the formation of the Office of Special Plans and supported by the neocons' noble lie ideology, "the apparatus of lying became insitutionalized". In his 2004 book Post-democracy, Colin Crouch used the term post-democracy to mean a model of politics where "elections certainly exist and can change governments", but "public electoral debate is a tightly controlled spectacle, managed by rival teams of professionals expert in the techniques of persuasion, and considering a small range of issues selected by those teams". Crouch directly attributes the "advertising industry model" of political communication to the crisis of trust and accusations of dishonesty that a few years later others have associated with post-truth politics. More recently, scholars have followed Crouch in demonstrating the role of professional political communication's contribution to distrust and wrong beliefs, where strategic use of emotion is becoming key to gaining truth for truth statements.

The term "post-truth politics" may have originally been coined by the blogger David Roberts in a blog post for Grist on 1 April 2010. Roberts defined it as "a political culture in which politics (public opinion and media narratives) have become almost entirely disconnected from policy (the substance of legislation)". Post truth was used by philosopher Joseph Heath to describe the 2014 Ontario election. The term became widespread during the campaigns for the 2016 presidential election in the United States and for the 2016 "Brexit" referendum on membership in the European Union in the United Kingdom.

Concepts
Information disorder has been proposed as an umbrella term for the wide variety of poor or false information being used for political purposes in post-truth politics.

Post-truth
Scholars and popular commentators disagree about whether post-truth is a label that is newly generated but can be applied to phenomena such as lying in any historical period; or whether it is historically specific, with empirically more recent observable causes (especially new social and political relations enabled by new digital communication technologies) and is only simplistically reduced to the age-old phenomenon of political lying. Scholars and popular commentators also disagree about the degree to which emotion should be emphasized in theories of post-truth, despite the emphasis on emotion in the Oxford Dictionary's original definition of the word. While the term "post-truth" had no dictionary entry before Oxford Dictionaries' entry in 2016, the Oxford entry was inspired by the outcomes of the Brexit referendum and the 2016 U.S. presidential campaign; it was thus already implicitly referring to politics. Further, in the original Oxford Dictionaries''' entry's (even today, more of a press release than traditional dictionary entry) justification for their choice, they say that it is often used in noun form of "post-truth politics". Thus, post-truth is often used interchangeably with post-truth politics.

Post-truth politics is a subset of the broader term post-truth, whose use precedes the recent focus on political events. While Oxford Dictionaries influentially named post-truth its 2016 word-of-the-year, current academic development of post-truth as a concept does not entirely reflect their original emphasis on "circumstances" where appeals to "objective facts" fail to influence as much as "appeals to emotion and personal belief" (see "Drivers" section below). The use of post-truth communication as a major tool in political campaigns such as the Brexit debate in the UK and the Trump campaign in the United States resulted in intense scholarly and journalistic interest in it as an aspect of politics. The existence of "post-truth politics" as a concept that makes sense and is a problem in the political life of liberal democracies is sometimes denied by critics.

Some uses of the concept are more general, referring not to historical conditions of widely empirically documented distrust or a context of promotional capitalism, easily accessible and hard-to-control amateur mass communication of social media, but to the presence of lying and distrust in politics and bias in journalism (and commentators' opinions that people of the day were distrustful or that political lying was common).  Reducing the concept of post-truth to dishonest political communication and different styles thereof, some scholars argue that what one identifies as post-truth politics today is really a return of previous periods of politics. Jennifer Hochschild, H.L. Jayne Professor of Government at Harvard University, has described the rise of post-truth as a return to 18th- and 19th-century political and media practices in the United States, followed by a period in the 20th century where the media was relatively balanced and rhetoric was toned down. Such a view nonetheless also conflicts with those in other countries at other times. For example, in 1957 scientist Kathleen Lonsdale remarked in the British context that "for many people truthfulness in politics has now become a mockery.... Anyone who listens to the radio in a mixed company of thinking people knows how deep-seated is this cynicism." Similarly, New Scientist characterised the pamphlet wars that arose with the growth of printing and literacy, beginning in the 1600s, as an early form of post-truth politics. Slanderous and vitriolic pamphlets were cheaply printed and widely disseminated, and the dissent that they fomented contributed to starting wars and revolutions such as the English Civil War (1642–1651) and (much later) the American Revolution (1765–1783).

Drivers
Communication and media scholars and philosophers tend to view the definition, origins, and causes of post-truth slightly differently. Media and communication scholars emphasize the historical revolution in communication technologies, which has fundamentally altered social life, including our ways of knowing socially (social epistemology), our authorities, and trust in institutions. Some also do not see post-truth as primarily a problem of knowledge, but rather of confusion, disorientation, and distrust. Philosophers tend to cite media and communications changes but claim that philosophical and cultural movements themselves, such as postmodernism, have influenced society, resulting in a situation where feeling and belief create an epistemic crisis for politics. Scholars in the field of science and technology studies (STS) have studied post-truth as part of the evolution of knowledge society, and as shifts to long-standing roles of scientific truth-telling in public and political arenas.

The "circumstances" surrounding post-truth (politics) noted by the original Oxford Dictionaries' definition have been expanded to denote a historical period, defined by the convergence of numerous empirically documented shifts. As opposed to early commentators who described it as a long-standing part of political life that was less notable before the advent of the Internet and related social changes, several scholars point to a host of empirical changes that are contemporary and are the core of the concept. For these scholars, post-truth differs from traditional contesting and falsifying of facts in public life by pointing to a cultural and historical convergence of several developments:
 An abundance of competing truth claims, partly due to accessible technologies of communication production, personal websites, videos, micro-blogging, and chat groups;
 A lack of shared authorities for adjudicating truth claims, especially with the demise of traditional journalism as a gatekeeper of issues and public truth claims;
 A fragmented public space, facilitated by algorithms, where truth claims appear unchallenged or unexamined by a larger public in attendance to them, sometimes associated with false knowledge effects of echo chambers and filter bubbles;
 A well-resourced influence or persuasive industry in public relations, marketing, advertising, and big data analytics, whose goals are especially to influence, not inform or educate;
 A cultural backdrop of "promotional culture", characterized by self-promoting, self-branding, user-generated content, about image as much as truth;
 A resorting to emotion and cognitive bias as a means to practically deal with the competition and confusion;
 A far-reaching context of social distrust to which post-truth political communication contribute and are affected by;
 Communication technologies corresponding to a culture of acceleration, distraction, and "hot cognition; and, perhaps, changing historical ethics about how much misleading or "spin" is acceptable.

In 2015 media and politics scholar Jayson Harsin coined the term "regime of post-truth" which encompasses many aspects of post-truth politics. He argues that a convergent set of historical developments have created the conditions of post-truth society and its politics: the political communication informed by cognitive science, which aims at managing perception and belief of segmented populations through techniques like microtargeting, which includes the strategic use of rumors and falsehoods; the fragmentation of modern, more centralized mass news media gatekeepers, which have largely repeated one another's scoops and their reports; the attention economy marked by information overload and acceleration, user-generated content and fewer society-wide common trusted authorities to distinguish between truth and lies, accurate and inaccurate; the algorithms which govern what appears in social media and search engine rankings, based on what users want (per algorithm) and not on what is factual; and news media which have been marred by scandals of plagiarism, hoaxes, propaganda, and changing news values. These developments have occurred on the background of economic crises, downsizing and favoring trends toward more traditional tabloid stories and styles of reporting, known as tabloidization and infotainment. In this view, post-truth cannot be understood without regard for the revolution in communication technologies and social life, their effects on cognition (the way people are disposed to think online), in a backdrop of social acceleration. In terms of entertainment, scholars such as Corner and Pels (2003) and Harsin (2018, 2021) argue that citizens' orientations towards politics are dispositions formed first as audiences in relation to entertainment forms such as reality television, which can be shown to be transposable to their evaluation of political communication.

While some of these phenomena (such as a more tabloidesque press) may suggest a return to the past, the effect of the convergences is a socio-political phenomenon which exceeds earlier forms of journalism in deliberate distortion and struggle. Fact-checking and rumor-busting sites abound, but they are unable to reunite a fragmented set of audiences (attention-wise) and their respective trustful-/distrustfulness. Harsin has called it a "regime of post-truth" instead of merely post-truth politics, with professional pan-partisan political communication manipulating the communication competitively in a context where institutions and discourses (such as science and news media) were interdependent on one another to stabilize the public circulation of truth. Cosentino (2019) expands the concept of regime of post-truth to a geo-political level, analyzing political communication cases in the non-Western as well as Western world.

Other scholars, such as the philosopher Lee McIntryre (2018), who focuses on "post-truth" generally but makes reference to politics, argue that rising social distrust of scientific expertise and postmodern academic discourse, allegedly promoting a devaluing of or disregard for truth, have combined with cognitive biases to produce conditions where feeling triumphs over facts. While several of these scholars cite distrust as an agent of post-truth social and political effects, the origin of the distrust is less clear. McIntyre sees public relations efforts to undermine scientific truths, on, for example, the effects of tobacco, as important factors (in addition to the alleged influence of academic postmodernism on conservative politics, though this link is not empirically established). As another specific example of corporate interests undermining truths for which there exists scientific consensus, McIntyre cites previous donations of BP to organizations which deny climate change. However, public relations is just one part of a larger culture of promotionalism (consumer capitalism), where truth has long been the last concern in strategies to influence people to feel positively or negatively towards brands as businesses, countries, products, parties, and politicians. Furthermore, the scandals in journalism around plagiarism and "cheerleading" for the 2003 U.S. invasion of Iraq, combine with promotional culture, ethically questionable professional strategic political communication, potential viral mediascapes, algorithmically customized presentation of information, among other factors to reproduce various forms of specific and generalized distrust—trust being crucial for recognition of legitimate public truth-tellers.

While many popular treatments of post-truth (sometimes used interchangeably with fake news) claim or imply a growth in political lying, Kalpokas (2018), Harsin (2015, 2017, 2018, 2021), and Cosentino (2019) see lying as only one feature of post-truth (which cannot historically distinguish it as new), instead focusing on problems of distinguishing true and false (common authorities for inducing belief being scarcer), or on disorientation, confusion, misperception, and distraction. The appeals to scientific expertise (though minority views in their fields), as with anti-vaccine supporters, demonstrates that across the board, people do in fact respect scientific experts, or the idea thereof. But science and expertise have been politicized, making it harder for the unknowing to identify legitimate authorities (all of whom may hold advanced degrees). Furthermore, it may not be so much that post-truth is manifest trust in one's emotions before truth claims as one's identification of emotional truth-tellers as authentic, honest, and therefore trustworthy.

Misinformation
Misinformation is inadvertently false or misleading information used in political discourse. The term is also used as an umbrella term for any type of misinformation, disinformation, or fake news.

Disinformation
Disinformation is purposely and intentionally misleading information, for example, in propaganda.

Fake news
Fake news is "fabricated information that mimics news media content in form but not in organizational process or intent."

Conspiracy theories
Conspiracy theories are elaborate packages of interconnected assertions with respect to powerful conspirators which are typically characterized by improbability; however, actual political conspiracies such as the Watergate breakin and coverup do exist.

Vulnerability
There are two aspects of vulnerability to misinformation: gullibility with respect to poorer information, and distrust and skepticism with respect to better information that might correct it.

Manufactured controversy
Political operatives in the post-truth space may fabricate controversies for economic or political advantage or, as in gaslighting, to disorient and confuse the public.

Description

In modern professionalization of political communication (tied to marketing and advertising research), a defining trait of post-truth politics is that campaigners continue to repeat their talking points, even when media outlets, experts in the field in question, and others provide proof that contradicts these talking points. For example, during campaigning for the British EU referendum campaign, Vote Leave made repeated use of the claim that EU membership cost £350 million a week, although later began to use the figure as a net amount of money sent directly to the EU. This figure, which ignored the UK rebate and other factors, was described as "potentially misleading" by the UK Statistics Authority, as "not sensible" by the Institute for Fiscal Studies, and was rejected in fact checks by BBC News, Channel 4 News and Full Fact. Vote Leave nevertheless continued to use the figure as a centrepiece of their campaign until the day of the referendum, after which point they downplayed the pledge as having been an "example", pointing out that it was only ever suggested as a possible alternative use of the net funds sent to the EU. Tory MP and Leave campaigner Sarah Wollaston, who left the group in protest during its campaign, criticised its "post-truth politics". The justice secretary Michael Gove controversially claimed in an interview that the British people "Had had enough of experts".

However, the charges of "post-truth politics" could also be levelled against those who repeatedly claimed the Vote Leave pledge to spend £350 million saved from EU membership on the NHS was a lie. A figure less than £350 million per week was only obtained by ignoring the cost to the UK Government of allowing the EU tariff-free access to the UK's single market. In 2015 this loss of UK Government revenue would have been £12.9 billion per year. Furthermore, in the years following the referendum spending in the NHS actually increased beyond the pledged £350 million. In real terms (indexed to 2020–21 prices) the increase between 2016–17 and 2021–22 was £21.6 billion per year (or £415 million per week). This increase would have been much larger if additional spending on the COVID-19 epidemic had not been factored out of the figures.

Michael Deacon, parliamentary sketchwriter for The Daily Telegraph, summarised the core message of post-truth politics as "Facts are negative. Facts are pessimistic. Facts are unpatriotic."  He added that post-truth politics can also include a claimed rejection of partisanship and negative campaigning. In this context, campaigners can push a utopian "positive campaign" to which rebuttals can be dismissed as smears and scaremongering and opposition as partisan.

In its most extreme mode, post-truth politics can make use of conspiracism. In this form of post-truth politics, false rumors (such as the "birther" or "Muslim" conspiracy theories about Barack Obama) become major news topics. In the case of the "pizzagate" conspiracy, this resulted in a man entering the Comet Ping Pong pizzeria and firing an AR-15 rifle.

In contrast to simply telling untruths, writers such as Jack Holmes of Esquire describe the process as something different, with Holmes putting it as: "So, if you don't know what's true, you can say whatever you want and it's not a lie". Finally, scholars have argued that post-truth is not simply about clear cut true/false statements and people's failure to distinguish between them but about strategically ambiguous statements that may be true in some ways, from some perspectives and interpretations, and false in others. This was the case around the disinformation campaigns of the UK and US in promoting the US invasion of Iraq (Saddam Hussein/Al Qaeda "ties" or "links" and Weapons of Mass Destruction), which have been described as watershed moments of the post-truth era.

 Major news outlets 

Several trends in the media landscape have been blamed for the perceived rise of post-truth politics. One contributing factor has been the proliferation of state-funded news agencies like CCTV News and RT, and Voice of America in the US which allow states to influence Western audiences. According to Peter Pomerantsev, a British-Russian journalist who worked for TNT in Moscow, one of their prime objectives has been to de-legitimize Western institutions, including the structures of government, democracy, and human rights.
As of 2016, trust in the mainstream media in the US had reached historical lows.
It has been suggested that under these conditions, fact checking by news outlets struggles to gain traction among the wider public and that politicians resort to increasingly drastic messaging.

Many news outlets desire to appear to be, or have a policy of being, impartial. Many writers have noted that in some cases, this leads to false balance, the practice of giving equal emphasis to unsupported or discredited claims without challenging their factual basis. The 24-hour news cycle also means that news channels repeatedly draw on the same public figures, which benefits PR-savvy politicians and means that presentation and personality can have a larger impact on the audience than facts, while the process of claim and counter-claim can provide grist for days of news coverage at the expense of deeper analysis of the case.

 Social media and the Internet 
General availability of vast amounts of information on the internet bypassed established media that were generally reliable due to editorial process and professional journalistic and academic discipline which acted as gatekeepers which filtered out misinformation. Now misinformation that might have been filtered out is often published in popular globally accessible forums which enter the marketplace of ideas liberal democracies depend on for informing their electorate.

Social media adds an additional dimension, as user networks can become echo chambers possibly emphasised by the filter bubble where one political viewpoint dominates and scrutiny of claims fails, allowing a parallel media ecosystem of websites, publishers and news channels to develop, which can repeat post-truth claims without rebuttal.
In this environment, post-truth campaigns can ignore fact checks or dismiss them as being motivated by bias. The Guardian editor-in-chief Katherine Viner laid some of the blame on the rise of clickbait, articles of dubious factual content with a misleading headline and which are designed to be widely shared, saying that "chasing down cheap clicks at the expense of accuracy and veracity" undermines the value of journalism and truth. In 2016, David Mikkelson, co-founder of the fact checking and debunking site Snopes.com, described the introduction of social media and fake news sites as a turning point, saying "I'm not sure I'd call it a post-truth age but ... there's been an opening of the sluice-gate and everything is pouring through. The bilge keeps coming faster than you can pump."

The digital culture allows anybody with a computer and access to the internet to post their opinions online and mark them as fact which may become legitimized through echo-chambers and other users validating one another. Content may be judged based on how many views a post gets, creating an atmosphere that appeals to emotion, audience biases, or headline appeal instead of researched fact. Content which gets more views is continually , regardless of its legitimacy. Some also argue that the abundance of fact available at any time on the internet leads to an attitude focused on knowing basic claims to information instead of an underlying truth or formulating carefully thought-out opinions. The Internet allows people to choose where they get their information, often facilitating them to reinforce their own opinions.

Researchers have developed prototypical falsity scores for over 800 contemporary elites on Twitter and associated exposure scores. Various similar countermeasures that are largely based on technical changes or extensions to common platforms and software have been proposed .

In 2017, a rise in national protests sparked against the 2016 United States presidential election and the victory of Donald Trump attributed to the fake news stories posted and shared by millions of users on Facebook. Following this incident, the spread of misinformation was given the word "post-truth", a term coined from Oxford Dictionaries as the "word of the year".

 Polarized political culture 
The rise of post-truth politics coincides with polarized political beliefs. A Pew Research Center study of American adults found that "those with the most consistent ideological views on the left and right have information streams that are distinct from those of individuals with more mixed political views—and very distinct from each other". Data is becoming increasingly accessible as new technologies are introduced to the everyday lives of citizens. An obsession for data and statistics also filters into the political scene, and political debates and speeches become filled with snippets of information that may be misconstrued, false, or not contain the whole picture. Sensationalized television news emphasizes grand statements and further publicizes politicians. This shaping from the media influences how the public views political issues and candidates.

Origin
Post-truth politics has its origins in the reaction of sectors of the public to widespread adoption of neoliberalism and other proposed global solutions to problems such as climate change and the COVID-19 pandemic by global economic and political elites.

In Six Faces of Globalization: Who Wins, Who Loses, and Why It Matters, a book by Anthea Roberts and Nicolas Lamp, two Australian scholars, the establishment neoliberal narrative and major reactions to it such as the "left-wing populist narrative", the "corporate power narrative", the "right-wing populist narrative", the "geoeconomic narrative" and a number of "global threats narratives" are compared and contrasted.

The establishment narrative supported by consensus of democratic political parties and institutions such as the World Bank, the International Monetary Fund (IMF) and the World Trade Organization (WTO) is based on international negotiation of agreements allowing the economic principles of competition and comparative advantage to operate, maximizing gross domestic product (GDP) in each country. The principles employed are well established and work, producing expanded global economic production, but also result in gains for some sectors of the international economy and losses for others.

 Dissenting views 

Unlike some academic treatments of post-truth that see it as historically specific and closely associated with shifts in journalism, social trust, and new media and communication technologies, several popular commentators (pundits and journalists), equating post-truth with lying or sensational news, have proposed that post-truth is an imprecise or misleading term and/or should be abandoned. In an editorial, New Scientist suggested "a cynic might wonder if politicians are actually any more dishonest than they used to be", and hypothesized that "fibs once whispered into select ears are now overheard by everyone". David Helfand argues, following Edward M. Harris, that "public prevarication is nothing new" and that it is the "knowledge of the audience" and the "limits of plausibility" within a technology-saturated environment that have changed. We are, rather, in an age of misinformation where such limits of plausibility have vanished and where everyone feels equally qualified to make claims that are easily shared and propagated. The writer George Gillett has suggested that the term "post-truth" mistakenly conflates empirical and ethical judgements, writing that the supposedly "post-truth" movement is in fact a rebellion against "expert economic opinion becoming a surrogate for values-based political judgements".

Toby Young, writing for The Spectator, called the term a "cliché" used selectively primarily by left-wing commentators to attack what are actually universal ideological biases, contending that "[w]e are all post-truthers and probably always have been". The Economist has called this argument "complacent", however, identifying a qualitative difference between political scandals of previous generations, such as those surrounding the Suez Crisis and the Iran–Contra affair (which involved attempting to cover-up the truth) and contemporary ones in which public facts are simply ignored. Similarly, Alexios Mantzarlis of the Poynter Institute said that political lies were not new and identified several political campaigns in history which would now be described as "post-truth". For Mantzarlis, the "post-truth" label was—to some extent—a "coping mechanism for commentators reacting to attacks on not just any facts, but on those central to their belief system", but also noted that 2016 had been "an acrimonious year for politics on both sides of the Atlantic". Mantzarlis also noted that interest in fact checking had never been higher, suggesting that at least some reject "post-truth" politics.

In addition, The Guardian's Kathryn Viner notes that while false news and propaganda are rampant, social media is a double-edged sword. While it has helped some untruths to spread, it has also restrained others; as an example, she said The Suns false "The Truth" story following the Hillsborough disaster, and the associated police cover-up, would be hard to imagine in the social media age.

By country
Post-truth politics has been applied as a political buzzword to a wide range of political cultures; one article in The Economist identified post-truth politics in Austria, Germany, North Korea, Poland, Russia, Turkey, the United Kingdom, and the United States.

Germany

In December 2016 "postfaktisch" (post-factual) was named word of the year by the Gesellschaft für deutsche Sprache (German language society), also in connection with a rise of right-wing populism from 2015 on.  Since the 1990s, "post-democracy" was used in sociology more and more.

India
Amulya Gopalakrishnan, columnist for The Times of India, identified similarities between the Trump and Brexit campaigns on the one hand, and hot-button issues in India such as the Ishrat Jahan case and the ongoing case against Teesta Setalvad on the other, where accusations of forged evidence and historical revisionism have resulted in an "ideological impasse".

Indonesia
Post-truth politics have been discussed in Indonesia since at least 2016. In September 2016, the incumbent governor of Jakarta Basuki Tjahaja Purnama, during a speech to citizens of Thousand Islands, said that some citizens were being "deceived using Verse 51 of Al Maidah and other things", referring to a verse of the Quran used by his political opponents. The video was later edited to omit a single word, misrepresenting his statement and instigating a political scandal that resulted in a blasphemy charge and two-year imprisonment. Since this event, post-truth politics have played a more significant role in political campaigns, as well as interactions between Indonesian voters. Yoseph Wihartono, researcher in crimonology at the University of Indonesia, identified social media outlets and "internet mobbing" as sources of post-truth dynamics that have potentially "opened wide" the opportunity for religious populism to expand.

South Africa
Health care and education in South Africa was substantially compromised during the presidency of Thabo Mbeki due to his HIV/AIDS denialism.

United Kingdom
An early use of the phrase in British politics was in March 2012 by Scottish Labour MSP Iain Gray in criticising the difference between Scottish National Party's claims and official statistics. Scottish Labour leader Jim Murphy also described an undercurrent of post-truth politics in which people "cheerfully shot the messenger" when presented with facts that did not support their viewpoint, seeing it among pro-independence campaigners in the 2014 Scottish independence referendum, and Leave campaigners in the then-upcoming EU membership referendum.

Post-truth politics has been retroactively identified in the lead-up to the Iraq War, particularly after the Chilcot Report, published in July 2016, concluded that Tony Blair misrepresented military intelligence to support his view that Iraq's chemical weapons program was advanced.

The phrase became widely used during the 2016 UK EU membership referendum to describe the Leave campaign. Faisal Islam, political editor for Sky News, said that Michael Gove used "post-fact politics" that were imported from the Trump campaign; in particular, Gove's comment in an interview that "I think people in this country have had enough of experts..." was singled out as illustrative of a post-truth trend, although this is only part of a longer statement. Similarly, Arron Banks, the founder of the unofficial Leave.EU campaign, said that "facts don't work ... You've got to connect with people emotionally. It's the Trump success." Andrea Leadsom—a prominent campaigner for Leave in the EU referendum and one of the two final candidates in the Conservative leadership election—has been singled out as a post-truth politician, especially after she denied having disparaged rival Theresa May's childlessness in an interview with The Times in spite of transcript evidence.

United States

In conjunction with the rise of new media and communication technologies (especially the Internet and blogging) and the professionalization of political communication (political consulting), scholars have viewed the periods following 9/11 and the George W. Bush administration's strategic communication as a seminal moment in the emergence of what has subsequently been called post-truth politics, before the term and concept exploded in public visibility in 2016. The Bush administration's talking points about "links" or "ties" between Saddam Hussein and Al Qaeda (repeated in parallel by the Tony Blair government), and Hussein's alleged possession of Weapons of Mass Destruction (both highly contested by experts at the time or later disproven and shown to be misleading) were viewed by some scholars as part of a historical shift. Despite age-old precedents of political and government lying (such as the systematic lying by the U.S. government documented in The Pentagon Papers), these propaganda efforts were seen as more sophisticated in their organization and execution in a new media age, part of a complicated new public communication culture (between a wide number of cable and satellite TV, online, and legacy news media sources). In the U.S., the distrust and deception identified with strategic communication of Karl Rove, George W. Bush, and Donald Rumsfeld, among others, were a close historical precedent to controversies around truth (as accuracy and/or honesty) that entered the media agenda of U.S. public life, drawing significant news and new media attention and producing measurable confusion and false belief. The most spectacular examples studied by scholars include the presidential candidacy of John Kerry in 2004 (accusations by the Republican consultant-directed "Swift boat Veterans for Truth" that he lied about his war record) and then, several years later (prior to the 2008 U.S. presidential campaign), that then candidate Barack Obama was a Muslim, despite his declaration that he was Christian, and was using a fake birth certificate (allegedly born in Kenya).

In its original formulation, the phrase "post-truth politics" was used to describe the paradoxical situation in the United States where the Republican Party, which enforced stricter party discipline than the Democratic Party, was nevertheless able to present itself as more bipartisan, since individual Democrats were more likely to support Republican policies than vice versa. The term was used by Paul Krugman in The New York Times to describe Mitt Romney's 2012 presidential campaign in which certain claims—such as that Barack Obama had cut defense spending and that he had embarked on an "apology tour"—continued to be repeated long after they had been debunked. Other forms of scientific denialism in modern US politics include the anti-vaxxer movement, and the belief that existing genetically modified foods are harmful despite a strong scientific consensus that no currently marketed GMO foods have any negative health effects. The health freedom movement in the US resulted in the passage of the bipartisan Dietary Supplement Health and Education Act of 1994, which allows the sale of dietary supplements without any evidence that they are safe or effective for the purposes consumers expect, though the FDA has begun regulation of homeopathic products.

In a review for the Harvard Gazette, Christopher Robichaud—a lecturer in ethics and public policy at Harvard Kennedy School—described conspiracy theories about the legitimacy of elections and politicians, such as the "birther" idea that Barack Obama is not a natural-born US citizen, as one side-effect of post-truth politics. Robichaud also contrasted the behavior of the candidates with that following the contested result of the 2000 election, in which Al Gore conceded and encouraged his supporters to accept the result of Bush v. Gore. Similarly, Rob Boston, writing for The Humanist saw a rise in conspiracy theories across US public life, including Birtherism, climate change denialism, and rejecting evolution, which he identified as a result of post-truth politics, noting that the existence of extensive and widely available evidence against these conspiracy theories had not slowed their growth.

In 2016, the "post-truth" label was especially widely used to describe the presidential campaign of Donald Trump, including by Professor Daniel W. Drezner in The Washington Post, Jonathan Freedland in The Guardian, Chris Cillizza in The Independent, Jeet Heer in The New Republic, and James Kirchick in the Los Angeles Times, and by several professors of government and history at Harvard. In 2017, The New York Times, The Washington Post, and others, began to point out lies or falsehoods in Trump's statements after the election. Former president Barack Obama stated that the new media ecosystem "means everything is true and nothing is true".

Political "facts"
Newt Gingrich, a prominent American politician and Trump supporter, in an interview with CNN reporter Alisyn Camerota aired July 22, 2016, explained that facts based on the feelings of the electorate were more important in a political campaign than the statistics collected by a reliable government agency are: 
"CAMEROTA: They feel it, yes, but the facts don't support it. 
GINGRICH: As a political candidate, I'll go with how people feel and I'll let you go with the theoreticians.""GINGRICH As a political candidate, I’ll go with how people feel and let you go with the theoreticians." McIntyre, Lee. Post-Truth (The MIT Press Essential Knowledge series) (pp14,15). MIT Press. Kindle Edition.

Supporters of those who are publishing or asserting things that are not true do not necessarily believe them, but have accepted that that is how the game is played."These [middle-class] voters were not motivated by ignorance. They listened to Trump’s rhetoric [bit removed] on a level transcending the mere fact. As a friend of mine put it recently, Trump supporters took him seriously—they did not need to take him literally. His language is keyed to produce a feeling rather than make a convincing argument. The New York Times interviewed conservatives about what they regarded as truth, as opposed to “fake news,” and learned that political frames and emotion guide the reception of information as credible or not. Part of being credible is resonating with the lives and struggles of one’s audience. Cloud, Dana L.. Reality Bites. Ohio State University Press. Kindle Edition.

Environmental politics
Although the consensus among scientists is that human activities contribute to global warming, several political parties around the world have made climate change denial a basis of their policies. These parties have been accused of using post-truth techniques to attack environmental measures meant to combat climate changes to benefit industry donors. In the wake of the 2016 election, the United States saw numerous climate change deniers rise to power, such as new Environmental Protection Agency head Scott Pruitt replacing Barack Obama's appointee Gina McCarthy. In Australia, the repeal of carbon pricing by the government of Tony Abbott was described as "the nadir of post-truth politics" by The Age.

Solutions

 Solutions from Nayef Al-Rodhan 
Both technology companies and governments have started to make efforts to tackle the challenge of "post-truth politics". In an article for the journal Global Policy, professor Nayef Al-Rodhan suggested four particular responses:

 Improve the technological tools for fact checking. For example, Germany has already asked Facebook to introduce a fake news filtering tool.
 Greater involvement and visibility for scientists and the scientific community. The UK, for instance, has a series of Parliamentary committees at which scientists are called to testify, and present their research to inform policy-making. Similarly in Canada, the role of Chief Science Advisor was re-established and each department with even a small scientific capability was required to develop a policy for scientific integrity.
 Stronger government action. In countries such as the Czech Republic, new units have been set up to tackle fake news. The most important challenge here is to ensure that such state-led efforts are not used as a tool for censorship.
 Securitizing fake news. It is important to treat post-truth politics as a matter of security and devise global efforts to counter this phenomenon. In March 2017, the United Nations Special Rapporteur on Freedom of Opinion and Expression, the OSCE, and the Organization for American States issued a Joint Declaration on "Freedom of Expression and Fake News, Disinformation and Propaganda" to warn against the effects of fake news whilst simultaneously condemning any attempts at state-mandated censorship.

 Solutions from Sophia Rosenfeld 
In her 2019 book, Democracy and Truth: A Short History, American historian Sophia A. Rosenfeld recommends the following as potential solutions for dealing with "post-truth politics":

 Encourage truth-telling and fact-checking as ethical commitments to which people should commit themselves in public life. Rosenfeld recommends that society urge journalists and public figures to search for and share "empirically sound, carefully verified information" rather than speculation.
 Avoid reopening "settled debates," such as the earth's flatness, in an effort to ensure "balance." Doing so, she writes, provides a platform to claims and ideas which offer little value to the existing body of knowledge.
 Pressure tech and social media companies to combat disinformation campaigns. Rosenfeld argues that social media sites allow flashy disinformation campaigns to spread much more rapidly than verified information.
 Shift away from free-speech absolutism. She asserts that permitting false claims—such as the unfounded conspiracy theories surrounding the Sandy Hook Elementary School shooting—to be disseminated needlessly spreads harm.
 Protect the integrity of political institutions. Election integrity and independent judiciaries, argues Rosenfeld, are key to protecting society from the dangers of post-truth politics. She warns of the "distorting influence" of money on the information voters see and read leading up to elections. Courts, she writes, are integral both to protecting truth-seekers and to determining truth itself in matters of political, civil, and criminal dispute.
 Improve society's information literacy through education. Rosenfeld recommends that, beginning with elementary and secondary education, students should learn how to evaluate the veracity of claims they encounter as well has what qualifies as trustworthy evidence.
 Encourage nonviolent protest against lying and corruption and in support of truth-telling. Rosenfeld cites protests in support of police body cameras as well as the 2017 March for Science as examples.

 See also 

 
 
 
 
 
 
 
 
 
 
 
 
 
 
 
 
 
 
 
 
 
 "Art, Truth and Politics" (Nobel lecture)
 Why Leaders Lie (book)

References

Further reading
 Alloa, Emmanuel.  "Who's Afraid of the Post-Factual?" Los Angeles Review of Books, The Philosophical Salon (July 2017)
 Economist. "Post-truth politics: Art of the lie: Politicians have always lied. Does it matter if they leave the truth behind entirely?" (leader) The Economist, Sept 20, 2016
 Gewin, Virginia. Communication: Post-truth predicaments, Nature 541, pp. 425–427, (19 January 2017), 
 Harsin, Jayson. "Post-Truth and Critical Communication". Oxford Research Encyclopedia of Communication.  20 December 2018. Oxford University Press.  
 Hyvönen, Ari-Elmeri. "Defining Post-Truth: Structures, Agents, and Styles. E-International Relations (October 2018).
 McIntyre, Lee.  "Post Truth" MIT Press (February 2018) 
 Parmar, Inderjeet. "US Presidential Election 2012: Post-Truth Politics". Political Insight 3#2 (2012): 4–7.
 Pomerantsev, Peter. Nothing Is True and Everything Is Possible: The Surreal Heart of the New Russia (2014) 
 Rabin Havt, Ari, and Media Matters for America. Lies, Incorporated: The World of Post-Truth Politics (2016)  online
 Soldatov, Andrei and Irina Boroganhe. Red Web: The Struggle Between Russia's Digital Dictators and the New Online Revolutionaries (2015).
 Tallis, Benjamin. "Living in Post-truth". New Perspectives. Interdisciplinary Journal of Central & East European Politics and International Relations'' 24#1 (2016): 7–18.
 

Political communication
Election campaigning
Political campaign techniques
Political culture
Postmodernism
Truth
Sociology of knowledge
2010s neologisms
2010s in politics